Peg Woffington is a 1912 British silent historical film directed by A. E. Coleby and starring Leslie Howard Gordon. The film is based on the 1852 play Masks and Faces by Tom Taylor and Charles Reade. The play had previously been turned into a 1910 American film, and several further adaptations followed. It features the eighteenth century Irish actress Peg Woffington as a major character.

References

Bibliography
 Klossner, Michael. The Europe of 1500-1815 on Film and Television: A Worldwide Filmography of Over 2550 Works, 1895 Through 2000. McFarland & Company, 2002.

External links

1910s British films
1910s English-language films
1910s historical comedy films
1912 films
British black-and-white films
British historical comedy films
British silent short films
Films directed by A. E. Coleby
Films set in London
Films set in the 18th century
Silent historical comedy films